Saengchai Sunthornwat (June 12, 1943 – April 11, 1996) was a Thai journalist, lawyer and writer. He served as director of MCOT before his death.

Early life
He was born on June 12, 1943, in Prachin Buri Province. He was a son of Pradit and Bunyuen Sunthornwat. He finished secondary school from Triam Udom Suksa School, bachelor's degree from Thammasat University and did his masters degree from a university in the United States. He married Watcharee Sunthornwat with whom he had a son, Isara Sunthornwat.

Career
He had a job in law as well as restaurants in the  United States. In 1982, he started his career in journalism by writing columns for Phim Thai and Daily News. In 1983, his column about the English language, "Fud Fit For Fai" became popular.

He returned to Thailand in 1983, where he worked as the director of MCOT between 1993–1996.

Assassination 
Saengchai Sunthornwat was killed by a gunman who fired on his car as he was driving to his suburban Bangkok home on April 11, 1996.  Sunthornwat was aged 52. Ubol Bunyachalorthon was charged with masterminding the death, but was shot and killed before being convicted.

Honours
  Commander of the Order of the Crown of Thailand (1983)

In popular culture
 Modernine TV    discussed Saengchai Sunthornwat on TimeLine, 23 June 2015, in "Light ... of victory".

References

Saengchai Sunthornwat
Saengchai Sunthornwat
Saengchai Sunthornwat
Saengchai Sunthornwat
Saengchai Sunthornwat
Saengchai Sunthornwat
Deaths by firearm in Thailand
1943 births
1996 deaths
20th-century journalists
Saengchai Sunthornwat